The 33rd Armoured Brigade (33rd Armd Bde) was an armoured brigade of the British Army that was active in northwestern Europe in the Second World War from June 1944 until May 1945 and from 1980 to 1992.

History

Normandy
The brigade was formed in the United Kingdom on 17 March 1944 by the re-designation of the 33rd Tank Brigade. The brigade took part in the Normandy campaign and landed on Gold Beach on 6 June 1944. The brigade, consisting of three armoured regiments, was assigned to any infantry who were in need of armoured support; because of this mission, the brigade rarely fought as a single unit.

The brigade took part in several actions that comprised the Battle for Caen. On 11 June, the brigade took part in fighting at Le Mesnil-Patry. From 8–9 July, the brigade participated in Operation Charnwood; the capture of northern Caen. Supplementing the 59th (Staffordshire) Infantry Division, on 16 July, the brigade took part in Operation Pomegranate, part of the Second Battle of the Odon; an attack launched to divert German attention away from the upcoming Operation Goodwood attack. Following the Battle for Caen the brigade was then involved in the First Canadian Army’s attack towards Falaise; on 8 August the brigade took part in Operation Totalize.

Rhine Crossing
The brigade was reformed and re-equipped with LVT 4 (Buffalo amphibious armoured fighting vehicles) for the Rhine crossing and was placed under the command of the 79th Armoured Division.

Post War
During the 1970s the brigade was one of two "square" brigades assigned to 3rd Armoured Division. After being briefly converted to "Task Force Echo" in the late 1970s, the brigade was reinstated in 1981, assigned to 4th Armoured Division and based at Alanbrooke Barracks in Paderborn1986 assigned to 3 (UK) Armd Div. Following the fall of the Berlin Wall, in December 1992, the brigade was merged with the 20th Armoured Brigade and disbanded as part of the Options for Change programme.

Organisation
The Organisation of the brigade at certain times included:

Second World War 

 Brigade Headquarters & Signal Squadron, Royal Corps of Signals
 1st Northamptonshire Yeomanry (Dragoons), 17/3/44–18/8/45
 1st East Riding of Yorkshire Yeomanry (Lancers), 16/8/44–23/4/45
 The Queen's Own Staffordshire Yeomanry Regiment (Hussars), 26/4/45–26/6/45
 4th Royal Tank Regiment, 1/3/45–30/3/45
 11th Royal Tank Regiment, 28/1/45–30/3/45 and 26/4/35–19/8/45
 144th (8th Battalion Lancashire Fusiliers) Regiment, Royal Armoured Corps, 17/3/44–28/3/45
 148th (9th Battalion Royal North Lancashire Regiment) Regiment, Royal Armoured Corps, 17/3/44–16/8/44

Cold War 

 Brigade Headquarters & 202 Signal Squadron, Royal Corps of Signals
 Royal Scots Dragoon Guards, 1/1/1980–11/1986
 RHG(D), 11/1986–1/1990
 Life Guards, 1/1990–19/8/92
 1st Battalion, The Royal Highland Fusiliers(Princess Margaret's Own Glasgow and Ayrshire Regiment), 1/1/1980–11/1984
 1st Battalion, The Queen's Lancashire Regiment, 11/1984–2/1990
 3rd Battalion, The Light Infantry, 2/1990–1/12/1992
 1st Battalion, The Black Watch (Royal Highland Regiment), 1/1/1980–3/1985
 1st Battalion, The Royal Scots (The Royal Regiment), 3/1985–12/1988
 1st Battalion, The Queen's Own Highlanders (Seaforth and Camerons), 12/1988–3/1990

See also

 British Armoured formations of World War II
 List of British brigades of the Second World War

References

Sources

Armoured brigades of the British Army
Armoured brigades of the British Army in World War II
Military units and formations established in 1944
Military units and formations disestablished in 1945
Military units and formations established in 1980
Military units and formations disestablished in 1992